The University of Oulu is one of the largest universities in Finland, located in the city of Oulu. It was founded on July 8, 1958. The university has around 13,000 students and 2,900 staff. 21 International Master's Programmes are offered at the university. The university is often ranked as one of the better universities in Finland and in the top-400 worldwide.

History

 1919 Oulu College Association was founded to manage the establishment of a university in the town
 1958 Oulu University Act
 1959 Activities begin. Faculty of Philosophy (programs in biology and mathematics), Faculty of Technology (architecture, civil and industrial engineering) and Oulu Teaching School
 1960 Faculty of Medicine
 1965 Teaching begins in humanities
 1965 Departments of Electrical Engineering and Machine Engineering added to the Faculty of Technology
 1972 The Faculty of Humanities and the Faculty of Natural Sciences founded with the division of the Faculty of Philosophy
 1974 Faculty of Education
 1985 Professorship in Telecommunications Technology established at the Faculty of Technology
 1994 Biotechnology, Information Technology and Northern Issues defined as focus areas
 2000 Founding of the Faculty of Economics and Business Administration
 2006 Micro- and Nanotechnology Centre
 2007 Oulu Mining School
 2008 Martti Ahtisaari Institute of Global Business and Economics
 2009 Center for Internet Excellence (CIE)
 2010 New University Act, new focus areas
 2011 Center of Microscopy and Nanotechnology founded by joining the Micro- and Nanotechnology Centre and the Institute for Electron Microscopy
 2011 University of Oulu Graduate School (from 1.8.2011)
 2014 Faculty of Biochemistry and Molecular Medicine (from 1.1.2014)
 2014 Faculty of Information Technology and Electrical Engineering (from 1.1.2014)
 2014 Oulu School of Architecture (from 1.1.2014)

Campuses

There are two campus areas:

It includes six faculties, four focus institutes, Botanical Gardens and Museum, and university library Pegasus, and Tellus Innovation Arena.
Oulu University Hospital, Medical Research Centre (MRC) and Biocenter Oulu are also located there.

The University has a number of research units and shared locations. In Linnanmaa Campus there are:

 Thule Institute
 Martti Ahtisaari Institute
 Giellagas Institute
 Open University

Elsewhere in Northern Finland:

Kajaani University Consortium
Sodankylä Geophysical Observatory
Oulanka Biological Research Station (Kuusamo)
 Kerttu Saalasti Institute (Nivala) (former Oulu Southern Institute), 
Centre for Underground Physics in Pyhäsalmi
Kokkola University Consortium Chydenius

Faculties

The University of Oulu is divided into eight faculties

International Cooperation

The University of Oulu aims to promote mobility among its students. It takes part in a number of international exchange programmes, such as Erasmus Programme (Europe), Nordplus (Nordic Countries), FIRST (Russia), ISEP and International to International ISEP (USA, South America, Asia), UNC-EP (USA), north2north (USA, Canada, Russia, Nordic Countries), North-South-South (Africa). Besides, the University of Oulu has about 50 bilateral agreements with partner universities around the world.

Research

University works in 70 research areas. There are five research focus areas which are coordinated by four focus institutes. 

About 60 invention disclosures are done yearly from the University of Oulu. The university has also served as a birthing place for over 60 research-based companies.

Academic Rankings and Statistics 
The University of Oulu has been consistent in gender equality securing a ratio of 53 men to 47 women. The University has also consistently increased in citation per faculty ratio over the years, with positive increases each year. 

The University of Oulu has experienced fallback on international rankings like the QS Top 500 Universities list. The University of Oulu has fallen from spot #253 in 2014, sitting in spot #392 in 2023. The University lost its position in Finland's top 5 University lists according to the rankings, overtaken by University of Jyväskylä and Lappeenranta-Lahti University of Technology. However, the future looks bright for University of Oulu as it has been recovering its place in the world rankings.

The University of Oulu still remains in the top 3% of Universities globally, and is a popular option for international students who want to study and work in Finland, and is a respected and often cited institution of higher education in Finland. The University of Oulu is a popular University for domestic applicants due to their large number of programs and well kept institutions. 

In the year 2022, The University of Oulu received 17,667 domestic applications, and accepted 2,497 new students, making the University's 2022 domestic acceptance rate 14%. Because of this, The University of Oulu is a competitive university to get accepted into.

Notable alumni

Martti Ahtisaari, M.Sc., former President of Finland, Nobel Peace Prize laureate (2008)
Helena Aksela, Ph.D., first female professor of physics in Finland.
Leena Ala-Kokko, Ph.D., professor, biochemist, molecular biologist; co-founder and president of Connective Tissue Gene Tests.
Jarkko Oikarinen, D.Sc., the developer of Internet Relay Chat (IRC).
Leena Palotie, D.Sc., professor, geneticist
Jussi Pesonen, M.Sc. (Tech.), CEO of UPM-Kymmene Oyj.
Sakari Orava, D.Sc., professor, surgeon specializing in sports related injuries. Famous for operating  surgeries on many top athletes such as David Beckham.
Vuokko Hirvonen, Ph.D., professor and author, noted scholar of Sámi literature and education policies
Lasse Lehtinen, Ph.D., former Member of the Finnish Parliament and former Member of the European Parliament.
Pekka Aikio, M.Sc., president of the Sami Parliament of Finland for three terms from 1996 to 2008.
Tytti Isohookana-Asunmaa, Ph.D. Finnish Minister of Culture (1991-1995), member of the Finnish parliament, from the Centre Party (1983).
Marjo-Riitta Järvelin , M.D., Ph.D., epidemiologist and professor
Tuija Lehtinen, B.Sc., (Stat.), writer, freelance author. Known for Mirkka, Laura and Janne novel series, chief scriptwriter of The Dibidogs animation series. 
Sami Lopakka, M.A. musician and writer, one of two guitarists for the band Sentenced (1989-2005). 
Hannu Rajaniemi B.Sc. (Math), author of science fiction and fantasy. Known novel, The Quantum Thief. 
Ago Silde M.A., Estonian politician, governor of Ida-Viru County 2004-2007. 
Jari Vilén M.A., politician and a diplomat, served in the Finnish Parliament, representing the National Coalition Party and the district of Lapland(1999–2007).
Sauli Vuoti Ph.D. (Chem), musician, chemist, and freelance writer, vocalist and guitarist of the band Kinetik Control, founder of Inferno magazine.
Juha Sipilä M.Sc. (Tech.), former Prime Minister of Finland
Pirkko Mattila M.Sc., Member of the Finnish Parliament and Minister of Social Affairs and Health
Tytti Tuppurainen M.A., Finnish Minister for European Affairs (2019-), member of the Finnish parliament from the Social Democratic Party

University of Oulu alumni body is over 55,000.

Student services

Student Union of the University of Oulu (OYY) provides services to and supervises the interests of all undergraduate degree students in the University of Oulu. All bachelor's and master's degree students at the University of Oulu belong to the Student Union. By paying the Student Union membership fee, students are entitled to a student card which allows them to get student services and discounts. This way, students get inexpensive or free medical and dental care from Finnish Student Health Services, (YTHS) traveling discounts in trains and buses, student meals reduction, etc.

There are a number of students organizations or so-called student guilds presented within the University.

Student housing

Student Housing Foundation of Northern Finland (PSOAS) is the leading provider of student accommodation in Oulu. The organization operates on a foundation basis which ensures affordable rents for students. Following its mission, PSOAS offers housing services for people studying in Oulu as economically as possible. The residents of PSOAS houses in different areas around the city elect tenant committee for that area, which e.g. organises different activities, maintains club rooms and does other related issues, depending on the active members.

The new international student house, named Aurora, was built next to PSOAS housing office in downtown Oulu. The building was finished during the spring of 2013. The house is supposed to be accommodated both by international degree students and Finnish students. The main purpose of the new building is to support the internationalization of Oulu and give the international students better access to Finnish culture and local people. The premises will also support these efforts: More space is dedicated for casual get-togethers, as there is a lounge space on every floor and a café of high level will be serving both Finnish and foreign customers on the ground floor.

The International Student Barometer 2019 ranked the University of Oulu first in the world when it comes to internet access and sixth in overall life satisfaction.

Rectors

See also 
 City of Oulu
 List of universities in Finland

References

External links 

 

 
Oulu
Educational institutions established in 1958
Buildings and structures in Oulu
Linnanmaa
1958 establishments in Finland